The Nehrəm mine is a large salt mine located in south-western Azerbaijan in Babek District, close to Nehrəm. Nehrəm is one of the largest salt reserves in Azerbaijan and has estimated reserves of 2.5 billion tonnes of NaCl.

References 

Salt mines in Azerbaijan